The Victual Brothers, Vitalien Brothers or Vitalian Brethren were a loosely organized guild of 14th century Germanic privateers that initially included Mecklenburg nobility, but that later became more thoroughly the efforts of commoners, and turned to outright piracy. The guild had a clear historical effect in that era on maritime trade in the North and Baltic Seas. As privateers, they provisioned blockaded locations and otherwise served as a naval contingent on behalf of regional rulers, with clients that included the Queen of Denmark, and rulers of Mecklenburg and East Frisia. As their activities turned to piracy, the aims devolved to personal enrichment. 

The pledge of their adopted base of Gotland to the Teutonic Order by King Albert of Sweden led to that island's invasion and the destruction of Visby by Konrad von Jungingen and the Order in 1398; this disruption, the executions of some of their band in Hamburg, and the Hanseatic League's continuing effort to control and make safe trade on the Baltic Sea led to changing maritime influences and a decline of the band. 

The Victual Brothers band either were also sometimes known or possibly became a somewhat distinct group otherwise known as the Likedeelers. Klaus Störtebeker was identified with both, as a subordinate in the Victual Brothers and as one in command in the Likedeelers.

Background
The Victual or Vitalien Brothers, names drawn from the German Vitalienbrüder and associated with the Norse vitaliebrødrene, were a loosely organized guild of privateers, later turning to piracy, who affected maritime trade during the 14th century in the North and Baltic Seas. The name Victual Brothers is derived indirectly from the Latin word for provisions, victualia, and makes reference to their first mission, which was to supply the besieged city of Stockholm. More directly and specifically, as Dirk Meier explains in his Seefahrer, Händler und Piraten im Mittelalter (Seafarers, Merchants and Pirates in the Middle Ages):During the Hundred Years' war [1337-1453], the people who provisioned the army were called vitailleurs. In 1394, when Mecklenburg was at war with Denmark, the Dukes of Mecklenburg hired pirates (known as Vitalienbrüder) whose job was to maintain a supply of food for the city of Stockholm, under siege by the Danes. As privateers, they served as a naval contingent on behalf of various regional rulers, work that included provisioning blockaded locations, with clients that included the  Queen of Denmark, and rulers of Mecklenburg and East Frisia. Eventually, as the efforts became more thoroughly the efforts of commoners, and especially, as the band turned to piracy, their activities were aimed at their own enrichment, and not the provisioning of others. As historian Jörgen Bracker of Hamburg's Municipal Museum notes, the "Vitalien Brothers divided up all their loot among themselves", arguing that the notion that "these men were willing to give up any of their booty" was a false notion.

History of the Guild 

During the 14th century, Queen Margaret I of Denmark was battling Albert of Mecklenburg for Scandinavian supremacy; Albert had been King of Sweden since 1364 and Duke of Mecklenburg since 1383. Queen Margaret imprisoned Albert and his son Eric of Mecklenburg in order to subdue the Kingdom of Sweden, and her forces began a siege of Stockholm. As the dukes of the House of Mecklenburg were without a navy, they sought instead to wage a Kaperkrieg (Privateers' War) against Denmark and in the relief of Stockholm; to do so it engaged both the owners of commercial ships and the seafaring masses through issue of letters of marque to authorize the taking and disposal of plundered goods—letters that included the ports and towns of Rostock, Wismar, Ribnitz, and Golwitz and that, in the words of Dirk Meier, likely offered a way that the "nobility of Mecklenburg", through their "compact with bands of roving and unorganised pirates", could also encourage some among the minor aristocrats of Mecklenburg to "support and indeed join the pirates, in the hope of sharing some of ther booty". Through these letters, Mecklenburg was able to raise a force of Baltic Sea pirates that would rise to number on the order of 1400 persons, a force that in 1392 was pressed into the fight against Denmark, including as blockade runners in the supply of Stockholm.

These privateers and pirates came to be known as the Vitalienbrüder, and later, in English, the Victual Brothers, and they brought food and other provisions through the Danish forces to keep the city supplied, and otherwise engaged in war at sea. Alongside their breaking the blockade, Margaret and Albert came to agreement in 1395, with Stockholm "pantsatt til hanseatene [pledg[ing] to the Hanseatic League]", that led to Albert's freedom; city and sovereign thus freed, the troops of Queen Margaret were withdrawn, and peace returned. Despite having been denied a "grunnlag [basis, for operations] and being expected to disband, some sources indicate that the commanders of the privateers—yet "mainly nobles from Mecklenburg"—did not, instead moving their base of operations to Visby, on the island of Gotland. (At this time, the storied German pirates Klaus Störtebeker and Michael Gödeke had not yet risen to command.)

Organized as a brotherhood or guild, the Victual Brothers' main naval enemy in 1392 was the powerful Hanseatic town of Lübeck, which supported Denmark in the war. Apart from Lübeck, the Hanseatic League initially supported the Victual Brothers. Most of the Hanseatic towns had no desire for a victory for Denmark, with its strategic location for control of the seaways. For several years from 1392, the Victual Brothers were a strong power in the Baltic Sea. They had safe harbours in the cities of Rostock, Ribnitz, Wismar and Stralsund. They soon turned to open piracy and coastal plunder. In 1393 they captured the town of Bergen for the first time (plundering it again in 1429), proceeding in 1394 to Malmö and Visby. They occupied parts of Frisia and Schleswig, and plundered Turku, Vyborg, Styresholm, Korsholm and Faxeholm castle at Söderhamn in Hälsingland.

At the climax of their power, the Victual Brothers occupied the island of Gotland, Sweden, in 1394 and set up their headquarters in Visby. They also operated from the Turku archipelago;[Knut Bosson, who was the chief of Turku Castle from 1395 to 1398, had allied himself with the people of Mecklenburg, and so he supported the hijacking activities of the Victual Brothers and allowed them to operate in the area. Maritime trade in the Baltic Sea virtually collapsed, and the herring industry suffered from their depredations. Queen Margaret even turned to King Richard II of England and sought to charter English ships to combat the pirates. From 1395 onwards, Queen Margaret gained the upper hand politically. She united Denmark, Sweden and Norway and formed the Kalmar Union. The Hanseatic League was forced to cooperate with her

Decline
King Albert of Sweden conceded Gotland to the allied Teutonic Order as a pledge (similar to a fiefdom), which was followed by an invasion led by Konrad von Jungingen (1355–1407), the Grand Master of the Order, who conquered the island in 1398—destroying Visby and driving the Victual Brothers out of Gotland. After the Victual Brothers' expulsion from Gotland in 1398, the Hanseatic League tried repeatedly but unsuccessfully to completely control the Baltic Sea. 
Records indicate that some of the band were executed in Hamburg. Many remained at sea, after losing influence in the Gulf of Bothnia, the Gulf of Finland and Gotland, operating instead from the Schlei, the mouth of the river Ems, and other locations in Friesland.

Likedeelers

Some component of, or successors to, the Victual Brothers came to be known in the written records by the name Likedeelers ("equal sharers"), the name's interpretation being either one of equal sharing of raiding booty among themselves, or—in proposed distinction to the Victual Brothers pirate band—of sharing booty with the poor of the coastal population. They expanded their activities into the North Sea and along the Atlantic coastline, raiding Brabant and France and striking as far south as Spain.

Their most famous leader of the Likedeelers was Klaus Störtebeker, born in 1360 in Wismar, a ship captain who first appears in the record as a Victual Brother around 1394. The Low German word Störtebeker means "down the beakerful", a name he is alleged to have been given because could swallow four liters of beer without taking the beaker from his mouth (though the name is possibly just a surname of Wismar). In 1401, the Hamburg warship Die Bunte Kuh, leading a small fleet under Commander Simon of Utrecht, caught up with Störtebeker's forces near Heligoland; after a 3-day running battle, Störtebeker and some of his followers were overpowered, trapped and executed. Contrary to this account, Historian Jörgen Bracker of Hamburg's Municipal Museum notes that "[w]hile… other Vitalien Brothers were executed in Hamburg, 'there's no evidence that Störtebeker was among them'", though artistic renderings of the Störtebeker execution, from that city, exist. 

Other Likedeelers, sans their leader, continued their piracy and coastal raiding until about 1440, with maritime trade in both the North and Baltic Seas remaining in serious danger of attack.

See also
Thalassocracy
Baltic Slavic piracy

References and notes

Further reading

 
   The best English source—a German-English translation—that appears in this article as of January 2022; a book-length treatment that includes extensive information on the title subject.

External links 
 Agreement on reparations for injuries and damages by vitalians (made between King Henry IV of England and the Hanseatic League)
 Vitalienbrüder (in German)

Privateers
Piracy in the Baltic Sea
German pirates
Gotland
Hanseatic League
History of Hamburg
History of Lübeck
History of East Frisia
History of Bergen
15th century in Europe
Medieval Finland
Medieval pirates
History of Mecklenburg
Margaret I of Denmark